Kovlar (also, Beyuk Kovlar, Bol’shoy Kovlyar, Qovlar, and Kovlyar) is a village and municipality in the Sabirabad Rayon of Azerbaijan.  It has a population of 1,666.

References 

Populated places in Sabirabad District